Temptation Harbour is a British black and white crime/drama film directed by Lance Comfort, released in 1947 based on the novel Newhaven-Dieppe (L'Homme de Londres) by Georges Simenon.  The film was made at Welwyn Studios with sets designed by the art director Cedric Dawe.

Synopsis
A signalman on a quay sees a fight between two men. One of the men is deliberately pushed into the water and the signalman cannot save him, but decides to keep his suitcase which later finds is full of banknotes with a value of £5000.

Cast list
(in credit order)
Robert Newton as Bert Mallinson
Simone Simon as Camelia
William Hartnell as Jim Brown
Marcel Dalio as Insp. Dupré
Margaret Barton as Betty Mallinson
Edward Rigby as Tatem
Joan Hopkins as Beryl Brown
Kathleen Harrison as Mabel
Leslie Dwyer as Reg
Charles Victor as Gowshall
Irene Handl as Mrs. Gowshall
Wylie Watson as Fred
John Salew as CID Inspector
George Woodbridge as Mr. Frost
Kathleen Boutall as Mrs. Frost

Production
The film was based on Simenon's novella Affairs of Destiny which was restructured and relocated from France to England. The movie was a commercial success.

See also
 The Man from London (1943)
 The Man from London (2007)

References

External links
British Film Institute
Screenonline, Lance Comfort (director)
 
Review of film at Variety

1947 films
1947 crime drama films
British crime drama films
Films based on Belgian novels
Films based on works by Georges Simenon
Films directed by Lance Comfort
Films set in Sussex
Films shot at Welwyn Studios
British remakes of French films
British black-and-white films
1940s British films
Rail transport films